Josef Dostál (born 3 March 1993) is a Czech sprint canoeist. He won a bronze medal at the 2012 Summer Olympics in the K-4 1000 m event.

He won the silver medal in the K-1 1000 metres event at the 2016 Summer Olympics in Rio de Janeiro. He was also part of the Czech team that won bronze in the K-4 1000 metres event at the 2016 Summer Olympics. He was the flag bearer for the Czech Republic during the closing ceremony.

References

External links
 

1993 births
Living people
Czech male canoeists
Olympic canoeists of the Czech Republic
Canoeists at the 2012 Summer Olympics
Canoeists at the 2016 Summer Olympics
Canoeists at the 2020 Summer Olympics
Olympic silver medalists for the Czech Republic
Olympic bronze medalists for the Czech Republic
Olympic medalists in canoeing
Medalists at the 2012 Summer Olympics
Medalists at the 2016 Summer Olympics
Medalists at the 2020 Summer Olympics
Canoeists at the 2015 European Games
European Games competitors for the Czech Republic
Canoeists from Prague
ICF Canoe Sprint World Championships medalists in kayak
21st-century Czech people